Folkton is a small village and civil parish at the foot of the Yorkshire Wolds and on the edge of the Vale of Pickering on an area known as Folkton Carr (carr meaning low lands) in the Scarborough district of North Yorkshire, England. Until 1974 the village lay in the historic county boundaries of the East Riding of Yorkshire.

There is a church dedicated to St John the Evangelist. Folkton House, the former rectory is located on Filey Road. Towards Flixton is the former village school which is now closed, built in 1832.

According to the 2011 UK Census, Folkton parish had a population of 535, an increase on the 2001 UK Census figure of 461.

Geography 

To the south are the Wolds and further north, across the Carrs and up the hills at the other side of the Vale is Scarborough, beyond which to the north-west are the Yorkshire Moors.

History

Prehistoric features 
The area has been settled for many thousands of years. Above the village, at the top of Folkton Hill, was where the Folkton Drums were discovered. They are a set of chalk (the predominant stone in the area) carvings from the Stone Age. Bowl-shaped, they have been called drums as the carvings would be upside down were they to be used as bowls. They were discovered by William Greenwell in 1889. They were buried in a tumulus that sits at the intersection of several natural pathways through the Dales. This tumulus has now been identified as one of a network that acted as a guide through the maze of hills and valleys that make up the Dales which would have been heavily forested at the time. They can now be seen on display at the British Museum.

Modern history 
The Carr would have historically been lake or marsh depending on which climatic era is being discussed. Its natural state today would be as marsh land but it was drained in the 19th century to make room for agriculture.

The village was also the site of a Roman military base. Not much is known of this stage as subsequent building works have destroyed any archaeology; however, the regular finds of Roman artefacts such as coins and arrow heads indicate a substantial presence.

The village as it stands today was established with a small number of farm houses around 400 years ago. Later building added to and expanded these existing structures into larger houses and farms with attached barns. Many barns were then demolished during the 1800s to avoid the 'Roof Tax'.

In 1823 the Folkton parish was in the Wapentake of Dickering. Population at the time was 144. Occupations included three farmers, and the landlady of The Bell public house. Two miles to the west of the village, in the Folkton parish, and separated by one mile, were the settlements of East and West Flotmanby, each listed with a gentleman.

References

External links

Villages in North Yorkshire
Civil parishes in North Yorkshire